Backscatter is the reflection of waves, particles or signals. The term may also refer to:

 Backscatter X-ray, a new type of imaging technology
 Backscatter (DDOS), a side effect of denial-of-service attacks on computer resources
 Backscatter (email), a side effect of e-mail spam, viruses or worms
 Backscatter (photography), the orb-like image of an out-of-focus particle in a camera's flash